Mohammadreza Hazratpour Talatappeh (born March 31, 1999 in Urmia) is an Iranian volleyball player who plays as a libero for the Iranian national team and Iranian club Shahrdari Urmia.

Hazratpour in 2018 year invited to Iran senior national team by Igor Kolaković and made his debut match against Japan in the 2018 Nations League.

Honours

National team

Club

Individual
Best Libero: 2019 U21 World Championship
Best Libero: 2021 Asian Championship
Best Libero: 2021 Asian Men's Volleyball Championship

References

External links
Hazratpour on Instagram
Hazratpour on Facebook

1999 births
Living people
Iranian men's volleyball players
People from Urmia
Asian Games medalists in volleyball
Volleyball players at the 2018 Asian Games
Medalists at the 2018 Asian Games
Asian Games gold medalists for Iran
21st-century Iranian people